The 2016 Circuit of Ireland was the second round of the 2016 European Rally Championship, held in Northern Ireland between 7–8 April 2016.

The rally was won by Irish driver Craig Breen and co-driver Scott Martin, in Citroën DS3 R5 rally car.

Results

References
Final Results on ewrc-results.com

2016 in Irish sport
2016 European Rally Championship season
Circuit of Ireland
Rally Ireland